A  is a woman who serves as a waitress at a ryokan or Japanese inn.

Nowadays it refers to work in a butler's pantry, homemaking sector, or the managing division and its office staff.
At Kyuchu (the Imperial Court), such women were also named osue. 

In ancient times, nakai meant a lady's maid ranking between kami-jochu (maid of honor) and gejo (the lowest rank of maid). Now it means women who serve visitors in restaurants or inns. They are usually residential staff and work long hours.

See also
Meshimori onna

References 
はてなキーワード「仲居」 (in Japanese)
13歳のハローワーク　村上龍氏の職業紹介(by Ryu Murakami) (in Japanese)

Ryokan
Hospitality occupations
Personal care and service occupations